The Dayton, Sheridan and Grande Ronde Railroad (DS&GR) was a  narrow gauge railroad in Yamhill and Polk counties in the U.S. state of Oregon.

History
In 1877, farmers in Bellevue, Dallas, Perrydale, Sheridan and Willamina met to discuss building a railroad that would serve their towns.  An agreement was reached, and the railroad was incorporated.  The railroad constructed twenty miles of tracks on the Yamhill and South Yamhill rivers between Sheridan in the west and Dayton to the east.

By 1879, the railroad was out of money and taken over by a group of Scot capitalists led by the Earl of Airlie.  They paid off the debt of the DS&GR and formed the Oregonian Railway.

See also

List of defunct Oregon railroads

References

Culp, Edwin D. (1972). Stations West, The Story of the Oregon Railways, Bonanza Books, Page 65.

Defunct Oregon railroads
Narrow gauge railroads in Oregon
Transportation in Polk County, Oregon
Transportation in Yamhill County, Oregon
1877 establishments in Oregon
3 ft gauge railways in the United States